Valéria Szabó (born 2 March 1983 in Debrecen) is a former Hungarian handballer who most recently played for Kisvárdai KC and for the Hungarian national team.

She made her international debut on 14 October 2008 against France. She represented Hungary on the World Championship in 2009 and on the European Championship in 2010.

She retired from professional handball in 2018.

Achievements
Nemzeti Bajnokság I:
Silver Medallist: 2010, 2011
Bronze Medallist: 2009
Magyar Kupa:
Silver Medallist: 2009, 2011
EHF Cup:
Winner: 2005
Junior World Championship:
Silver Medallist: 2003
European Championship:
Bronze Medalist: 2012

References

External links

 Valéria Szabó career statistics on Worldhandball.com

1983 births
Living people
Sportspeople from Debrecen
Hungarian female handball players
Expatriate handball players
Hungarian expatriates in Russia